= 1897 Tipperary Senior Hurling Championship =

Annual hurling competition season

- Champions: Suir View (1st title)
- Runners-up: Horse & Jockey

The 1897 Tipperary Senior Hurling Championship was the eighth staging of the Tipperary Senior Hurling Championship since its establishment by the Tipperary County Board in 1887.

Suir View won the championship after a receiving a walkover from Horse & Jockey in the final replay. It remains their only championship title.
